The 2010 Bassetlaw District Council election took place on 6 May 2010 to elect members of Bassetlaw District Council in Nottinghamshire, England as part of the 2010 United Kingdom local elections. One third of the council was up for election.
After the election, the composition of the council was:
Conservative 25
Labour 20
Independents 3

Election result

Ward Results

Carlton

East Retford East

East Retford North

East Retford South

East Retford West

Everton

Harworth

Langold

Misterton

Tuxford and Trent

Worksop East

Worksop North

Worksop North East

Worksop North West

Worksop South

Worksop South East

References

2010 English local elections
May 2010 events in the United Kingdom
2010
2010s in Nottinghamshire